Alberto Sevieri (born 14 April 1945) is an Italian former sport shooter who competed in the 1988 Summer Olympics. Sevieri competed in the 1988 Summer Olympics in Seoul, South Korea aged 43 and placed 4th in the Men's 25m Rapid Fire Pistol.

References

1945 births
Living people
Italian male sport shooters
ISSF pistol shooters
Olympic shooters of Italy
Shooters at the 1988 Summer Olympics
Place of birth missing (living people)
20th-century Italian people